Robert Jackson "Jack" Tingle (December 30, 1924 – September 22, 1958) was an American professional basketball player. He was the first player from Trimble County, Kentucky to go to the University of Kentucky on a scholarship for basketball. He was one of only seven UK players to make the all SEC team four years in a row. After graduation, he played two seasons in the NBA for the Washington Capitols and Minneapolis Lakers. After his NBA stint he coached basketball at Hiseville High School and was an engraver for the Louisville Courier-Journal newspaper.

BAA career statistics

Regular season

References

1924 births
1958 deaths
All-American college men's basketball players
American men's basketball players
Basketball players from Kentucky
High school basketball coaches in the United States
Kentucky Wildcats men's basketball players
Minneapolis Lakers players
People from Trimble County, Kentucky
Power forwards (basketball)
Small forwards
Washington Capitols players
Washington Capitols draft picks